Crowd surfing is the process in which a person is passed overhead from person to person (often during a concert), transferring the person from one part of the venue to another. The "crowd surfer" is passed above everyone's heads, with everyone's hands supporting the person's weight.
At most concerts and festivals the crowd surfer will be passed towards a barrier in front of the stage by the crowd, where they will be pulled off and put on their feet by the security stewards. Then, they will be sent back to the side or rear of the crowd at the end of the barrier or they may be ejected from the venue (depending on the policy enforced). Other venues may allow the crowd surfer to go onto the stage with the artist for a brief period of time before stage diving or being escorted off the stage.

Crowd surfing generally occurs only towards the front of an audience where the crowd is dense enough to support a person's body. It is most popular at metal, punk, rock, rave and indie concerts.

In order to get above everyone's heads, a person can be given a boost, in which one person picks up another to launch them over the people's heads, or they can stage dive.

This has been known to happen to unwilling participants who have been boosted up by others by surprise, in which case, those participants may also be ejected.

Origins

Iggy Pop may have invented crowd surfing at 1970's Cincinnati Summer Pop Festival (Midsummer Rock Festival).

However, Bruce Springsteen appears in the first documented video of crowd surfing in his 1980 Rock concert at Arizona State University, in Tempe, Arizona during his live performance of "Tenth Avenue Freeze-Out".

In early 1980 Peter Gabriel was reported to have crowd surfed during performances of "Games Without Frontiers" by falling into his audience "crucifix style" and then being passed around. During a later tour in 1982 Gabriel also crowd surfed during performances of 'Lay Your Hands on Me'. The rear sleeve of his 1983 album Plays Live, recorded during Gabriel's 1982 tour, features a photograph of him crowd surfing, although the image has been rotated 90 degrees so Gabriel appears to be standing.

"Iggy Pop had jumped into an audience prior to me," Gabriel explained to Mark Blake, "but he hadn't done that thing of lying on the hands and being carried around by the audience. I had the idea from a game you did with a therapy group where you had to fall backwards and trust the person behind to catch you. I was always interested in closing the gap between the performer and the audience. At an open-air show in Chicago I was passed around and returned to the stage minus every piece of clothing except my underpants. There was an edge to doing it and part of you was praying you'd get back to the stage in one piece."

The first official video release to depict Gabriel crowd surfing was POV, a concert video released in 1990 and produced by Martin Scorsese. When Billy Joel crowdsurfed in a concert during his 1987 concert tour of the Soviet Union, bandmate Kevin Dukes described it as the "Peter Gabriel flop".

Dangers

Crowd surfing is illegal in some countries and patrons can, in theory, be ejected from the venue for partaking in the act. This is usually written in the fine print of the concert or festival ticket.

Supporters of crowd surfing say that by standing in the mosh pit, concert-goers should expect such behavior as part of a rock show and by standing more towards the side or rear of the venue they can easily avoid such behavior. They also say that serious injuries caused by crowd surfing are extremely rare. It is true that the majority of injuries caused by crowd surfing are only mild bruising, which occurs in any mosh pit without crowd surfing. It is common mosh pit etiquette to pick up anyone who has fallen over.

At larger events, such as festivals, crowd surfing can be used as a means of transporting individuals out of the crowd. On occasion, individuals may wish to leave the event because of any given reason, but there can be too many people bringing other people in. Therefore, some people use crowd surfing as a means to get out. Crowdsurfing can be used to help injured or sick participants find medical help quickly. A person losing consciousness at a large hot outdoor summer festival can arrive at medical help in less than a minute by being passed to security. Those facing the stage are often unaware of crowd surfers heading towards it and it is not uncommon for audience members to be kicked or otherwise hit in the back of the head. Opponents of crowd surfing claim that it is inappropriate for crowd surfers, stagedivers and moshers to dominate the most attractive area of the audience (directly in front of the stage) with the threat of (accidental) violence forcing people who do not want to get injured to stand at the back or to the side, which are much less attractive locations. Opponents argue that all visitors pay the same price for admission and are entitled to experience the concert without risk of getting kicked in the face or crushed by crowd surfers.

Crowd surfers also risk having personal items such as wallets or mobile phones stolen, or their shoes or clothes removed and thrown into inconvenient locations. This is known as "mosh-lobbing".

In December 2004 when the Beastie Boys performed at the Manchester Arena in Manchester, England, Ad Rock stopped partway through a song to warn the crowds to stop surfing as somebody had been injured, following up the discouragement with "that shit is so old" and telling them to "save that shit for the MTV music awards".

Events
The world record holder for the highest number of crowd surfers (recorded) in one performance is a mixed genre band during their performance at Reading festival in 2009. Enter Shikari provided the music and encouragement for this whilst security safely caught and redirected them out of a side gate back into the crowd. For a world record, the crowd surfer must "surf" over the barrier to be classed as a valid entry.

Crowd surfing extended for the first time to the classical music scene, when in June 2014 at the Bristol Proms an audience-member was ejected by fellow audience members during a performance of Handel's Messiah after he took the director's invitation to "clap and whoop" to the music a step too far by attempting to crowd-surf.

See also
 Air guitar
 Headbanging
 List of dances
 Moshing
 Stage diving
 Trust fall

References

External links

 Bruce Springsteen “Tenth Avenue Freeze-Out” The River Tour 1980
 Peter Gabriel crowd surfing in 1987 while performing Lay Your Hands On Me
 Crowd surfing at a rock festival in Poland (promotional video of Przystanek Woodstock)
 Leo Laporte crowd surfs at the DiggNation event at South by South West 2010

Surfing
Musical culture